Cycling Action Network (CAN) is a national cycling advocacy group founded in November 1996 in Wellington, New Zealand.  They lobby government, local authorities, businesses and the community on behalf of cyclists, for a better cycling environment. It aims to achieve a better cycling environment for cycling as transport. Major initiatives are the annual Cycle Friendly Awards and support for a biennial Cycling Conference. The organisation was originally named Cycling Advocates' Network until 2015.

Goals

CAN's goals are:

 Promote integrated cycle planning
 Promote the benefits of cycling
 Improve safety
 Encourage the creation of a good cycling environment
 Develop cycle advocacy and cycle action

Activities

NZ Cycling Conference 

CAN has made a major contribution to the establishment and ongoing success of the NZ Cycling Conference series (15 October 1997, Hamilton; 14–15 July 2000, Palmerston North; 21–22 September 2001, Christchurch; 10–11 October 2003, North Shore; 14–15 October 2005 Hutt City; 1–2 November 2007, Napier; 12–13 November 2009, New Plymouth); February 2012 Hastings.

Cycle Friendly Awards 

Since 2003, CAN has been organising the annual Cycle Friendly Awards, celebrating initiatives to promote cycling and create a cycle-friendly environment at both a national and local level in New Zealand. The event has since received public recognition, with government representatives attending the award ceremonies.

Chainlinks 
About a 1000 copies are distributed to members of CAN and a number of supporting organisations such as local government authorities and cycling industry organisations. Published since 1997, until 2015 it was a full-colour paper magazine, whose back issues are available online.

Association with other groups 

CAN is the parent organisation for some 20 local cycling advocacy groups around the country, including Cycle Action Auckland and Spokes Canterbury.

CAN was a member of BikeNZ and provided one board member from BikeNZ's inception in July 2003. CAN resigned from BikeNZ in October 2007, but continues to work with BikeNZ on advocacy issues.

CAN works closely with Living Streets Aotearoa, the national walking advocacy group.

See also 
 Bike Auckland
 Spokes Canterbury
 Cycling in Auckland
 Cycling in New Zealand
 Bicycle helmets in New Zealand
 New Zealand Cycle Trail

References

External links
 

Cycling organisations in New Zealand
Political advocacy groups in New Zealand
Cycling activism